The United Arab Emirates have competed in eight Summer Olympic Games. They have never appeared in any Winter Games. The UAE won their first medal at the 2004 Summer Olympics in Greece.

The United Arab Emirates National Olympic Committee was formed in 1979. They were recognized by the IOC in 1980.

Medal tables

Medals by Summer Games

Medals by sport

List of medalists

See also
 List of flag bearers for United Arab Emirates at the Olympics
 United Arab Emirates at the Paralympics

External links